Winterham is a historic plantation house located near Winterham and Amelia Court House, Amelia County, Virginia, on Grub Hill Church Road. It was built about 1855 and is a two-story frame structure with a hipped roof in the Italian villa style. It has four original porches and a cross-hall plan. Also on the property are a contributing late 19th century farm dependency and early 20th century garage.

It is the only known Virginia building by Thomas Tabb Giles, a significant amateur architect, and William Percival, a significant professional architect.  Giles was the son of Governor William Branch Giles, who owned Wigwam, another notable historic estate, located several miles north. A set of original architectural drawings for Winterham are housed at the Virginia Historical Society. In the 21st century, the house is privately owned and operated as a bed and breakfast and a venue for catering and weddings.

Winterham was added to the National Register of Historic Places in 2002.

References

External links
The Plantation Home of Winterham, now a historical bed-and-breakfast and event center

Plantation houses in Virginia
Bed and breakfasts in Virginia
Houses on the National Register of Historic Places in Virginia
Italianate architecture in Virginia
Houses completed in 1855
Houses in Amelia County, Virginia
National Register of Historic Places in Amelia County, Virginia